The Ice Follies of 1939 is a 1939 American musical drama film directed by Reinhold Schünzel, and starring Joan Crawford, James Stewart, Lew Ayres and Lewis Stone.

Using a show business backdrop, and featuring The International Ice Follies, Crawford plays Mary, an actress, who marries an ice skater and encounters career and relationship issues.

Plot
Larry Hall (James Stewart) and Eddie Burgess (Lew Ayres) have a successful skating act until Larry falls in love with Mary McKay (Joan Crawford), an inept skater whom Larry insists upon including in the act. Fired from job after job because of Mary's ineptitude, Larry keeps up his spirits by dreaming of producing a colossal ice show. Following their latest dismissal, the couple elope, and Mary, feeling guilty for damaging her husband's career, convinces Douglas Tolliver, Jr. (Lewis Stone), the head of Monarch Studios, to offer her a movie contract.

While reading the fine print of the contract, Mary discovers that she is forbidden to marry without the studio's permission, and Larry convinces her to keep their marriage a secret. Meanwhile, Eddie is disappointed with how distracted Larry has become and leaves town. After his wife's first picture catapults her to stardom, Larry finds himself relegated to the position of househusband and leaves for New York in hopes of producing his ice extravaganza.

In New York, Larry is reunited with Eddie in the office of producer Mort Hodges, who raises the money to make Larry's dream a reality. Larry's Ice Follies becomes a smash hit, and with husband and wife now equal in stature, Mary and Larry hope to revive their marriage. When they discover that they are still separated by the demands of their careers, however, Mary publicly announces that she is forsaking her career to return to a life of domesticity. The dilemma of their conflicting careers is finally bridged when Tolliver hires Larry to produce a musical film on ice starring his wife, thus uniting their personal and professional lives.

Cast
 Joan Crawford - Mary McKay/Sandra Lee
 James Stewart - Larry Hall
 Lew Ayres - Eddie Burgess
 Lewis Stone - Douglas 'Doug' Tolliver Jr.
 Lionel Stander - Mort Hodges
 Charles D. Brown - Mr. Barney
 Bess Ehrhardt - Kitty Sherman
 The International Ice Follies:
 Roy Shipstad - Himself (Ice Follies Skater)
 Eddie Shipstad - Himself (Ice Follies Skater)
 Oscar Johnson - Himself (Ice Follies Skater)

Production
Although there was little of the Joan Crawford's actual skating in The Ice Follies of 1939, MGM sent out press releases to announce that she was rigorously training to sing in the film.  (Crawford had already sung on-screen in a few early musicals like The Hollywood Revue of 1929 and Montana Moon.) The releases even suggested that Crawford was so impressive that after performing her six songs in this film, she was considering making her debut at the Metropolitan Opera. When the film premiered, however, her songs had been reduced to two, both of which were dubbed by a professional singer. Crawford would later claim that her vocals had been cut under orders from Jeanette MacDonald, who was afraid of being supplanted as MGM's resident singing star.

Reception
A critic in the New York Herald Tribune wrote, "Since some kind of story was needed to lead up to the film debut of "The International Ice Follies," and top-flight players to give it the necessary publicity gloss, Joan Crawford, James Stewart, and Lew Ayres were given the unenviable job of trying to make it digestible. Their acting is smart and likable; their material is not....Miss Crawford should avoid this type of film in the future, when she has to buck poor material, a group of specialists and Metro's own lavishness."

Frank Nugent in The New York Times commented, "Far be it from us to rap one of Mr. Rapf's more glittering productions; what we mildly object to is the fact that the glitter does not extend to the dialogue, the incidents, the characters (for whom "fictitious" is an understatement) or the story, which is the one about the matrimonial clashing of two careers."

Box office
According to MGM records the film earned $725,000 in the US and Canada and $448,000 elsewhere resulting in a loss of $343,000.

In popular culture
In the 1981 film Mommie Dearest, Ice Follies of 1939 is the film Crawford is preparing to film in the opening sequences.

References

External links
 
 
 
 
 Australian daybill long poster

1939 films
1930s musical drama films
American musical drama films
American black-and-white films
Figure skating films
Metro-Goldwyn-Mayer films
Films directed by Reinhold Schünzel
Films produced by Harry Rapf
1939 drama films
Films with screenplays by Florence Ryerson
Films set in New York City
Films with screenplays by Edgar Allan Woolf
1930s English-language films
1930s American films